R v Singh, is a leading decision of the Supreme Court of Canada on the constitutional right to silence and the confessions rule.

External links
 

Supreme Court of Canada cases
2007 in Canadian case law